The following lists events that happened during 1845 in Australia.

Incumbents

Governors
Governors of the Australian colonies:
Governor of New South Wales – Sir George Gipps
Governor of South Australia – Sir George Grey (to 25 October), then Lieutenant Colonel Frederick Holt Robe
Governor of Tasmania – Sir John Eardley-Wilmot
Governor of Western Australia as a Crown Colony – John Hutt.

Events
 12 March – St John the Baptist Church in Reid Canberra is consecrated.
 4 August – The ship Cataraqui is wrecked off the coast of Tasmania, the 406 people on board drown.
 20 July – Charles Sturt enters the Simpson Desert in central Australia.
 21 June – News of the discovery of a rich body of copper ore at Burra, South Australia is published in Adelaide newspapers.
 17 December – Ludwig Leichhardt arrives at Port Essington, Northern Territory, after an overland journey of 4800 km from Jimbour on the Darling Downs.
 Wool export in Australia – 24 million pounds.

Births

 12 January – Walter Howchin, geologist (born in the United Kingdom) (d. 1937)
 11 February – John Chanter, New South Wales politician (d. 1931)
 16 February – Maybanke Anderson, suffragette and reformer (born in the United Kingdom) (d. 1927)
 17 February – Percival Ball, sculptor (born in the United Kingdom) (d. 1900)
 25 February – Sir George Reid, 4th Prime Minister of Australia and 12th Premier of New South Wales (born in the United Kingdom) (d. 1918)
 20 March – Victor Child Villiers, 7th Earl of Jersey, 17th Governor of New South Wales (born in the United Kingdom) (d. 1915)
 3 April – William Farrer, agronomist (born in the United Kingdom) (d. 1906)
 15 April – Dave Gregory, cricketer (d. 1919)
 16 June – William Charles Kernot, engineer (born in the United Kingdom) (d. 1909)
 21 June
 Henry Brockman, Western Australian politician (d. 1916)
 Sir Samuel Griffith, 9th Premier of Queensland and 1st Chief Justice of Australia (born in the United Kingdom) (d. 1920)
 19 October – Frank Hann, pastoralist and explorer (born in the United Kingdom) (d. 1921)
 21 October – Ernest Favenc, explorer, journalist and author (born in the United Kingdom) (d. 1908)
 15 December – Thomas Skene, Victorian politician (d. 1910)
 30 December – Thomas Edward Spencer, writer (born in the United Kingdom) (d. 1911)

Deaths
 5 August – John Blaxland, New South Wales politician and explorer (born in the United Kingdom) (b. 1769)

References

 
Australia
Years of the 19th century in Australia